King Huiwen may refer to:
King Huiwen of Qin (reigned 338–311 BC)
King Huiwen of Zhao (reigned 298-266 BC)